Night of the Fox is a 1990 made-for-TV film by Charles Jarrott, based on the 1986 novel of the same name written by Jack Higgins. It was broadcast in France on TF1.

Plot
Professor Alan Stacy visits Jersey to complete his biography of his friend and pre-World War II fellow academic Harry Martineau, but arrives on the day of Harry's funeral. Only one mourner is present, Dr. Sarah Drayton. Invited back to her house, he is told by Sarah that the two of them worked for Special Operations Executive (SOE) during the war. She shows Stacy a photo of them posing with Field Marshal Erwin Rommel and then tells the story behind the photo.

In the aftermath of the Slapton Sands disaster, Hugh Kelso, a US Army colonel, is washed ashore on Jersey, He is rescued by Hélène de Ville, who contacts London. Brigadier Dougal Munro of SOE is aware that Kelso is one of the few officers who know the details of the planned D-Day landings. He decides that Kelso must either be rescued or eliminated.

He recruits Harry Martineau, a former academic and ruthless killer, now retired, and Sarah Drayton, a nurse with connections in, and local knowledge of, Jersey. Harry is persuaded to undertake one last job. Having previously operated in Germany, he becomes SD Standartenführer  Max Vogel. He is supplied with a forged letter of authority signed by Hitler and Himmler. Sarah's cover is that of Anne-Marie de la Tour, his expensive French mistress.

The two are smuggled to France and then travel to occupied Jersey. Harry sails on a naval vessel, but Sarah, as a civilian, must travel on a cargo boat commanded by Captain Guido Orsini, an Italian naval officer. Kelso is alarmed by their arrival, as he knows of Harry's reputation as a cold-blooded killer. The plan to evacuate the wounded Kelso is upset by the arrival of Field Marshal Erwin Rommel on a surprise tour of inspection. But no one in the party and only one of the German officers is aware that ‘Rommel’ is actually Corporal Erich Berger, an actor who serves as Rommel's double. The real Rommel has been drawn into a plot to assassinate Hitler and needs to be temporarily away from Germany.

A small airplane is sitting at the airfield for the weekly mail flight, but the flight cannot be commandeered except by special authority. Harry unmasks ‘Rommel’ as Berger and gets him to give that authority. Berger agrees to cooperate and reveals that he is actually Heini Baum, a German Jew who has assumed the identity of the dead Berger and has survived as a soldier.

The operation is nearly upset by the arrival of a German military policeman who holds them at gunpoint, but he is overpowered and placed in a car which is set on fire and pushed over a cliff. Sarah, Harry, Baum and Orsini, who has agreed to assist them, commandeer the plane and fly towards France. The crew are overpowered and ordered to fly to England.

The plan is discovered, too late, but a Luftwaffe night fighter is dispatched to shoot them down. One of the crew is killed, and Harry orders the pilot to drop to almost sea-level, drawing down the pursuing fighter, which crashes. They continue to England, now in radio contact with the RAF.

On landing, they are surrounded by armed soldiers. Baum rushes excitedly forward and is shot by a guard, ostensibly by accident but probably on Munro's orders. As he dies, he begs Harry to say Kaddish for him.

The action returns to the present, and Sarah reveals that she later married Orsini and lived in Florence as Contessa Orsini. She tells Stacy that Harry continued to work for SOE but was shot down by friendly fire a few months later. His body, buried in the Essex marshes, was not found until recently and he has now received a much belated burial.

Cast
 George Peppard as Harry Martineau/ Standartenfuhrer Max Vogel
 Deborah Raffin as Sarah Drayton
 John Mills as Dougal Munro
 Michael York as Erwin Rommel/Berger/Baum
 David Birney as Kelso
 Gottfried John as Hofer
 Juliet Mills as Barmaid
 John Standing as Alan Stacey
 George Mikell as Major Hecker
 Demeter Bitenc as Col. Halder
 Vincent Grass as Greiser

External links

1990 films
1990 television films
British television films
British spy films
British war adventure films
1990s spy films
1990s war adventure films
World War II spy films
Films based on British novels
Films based on thriller novels
Films set in the Channel Islands
Jersey in fiction
Films set in France
Special Operations Executive in fiction
Cultural depictions of Erwin Rommel
Films scored by Vladimir Cosma
British World War II films
Films directed by Charles Jarrott
1990s English-language films
1990s British films